Sigma Lambda Alpha may refer to:

 Sigma Lambda Alpha (sorority), an American Latina-based organization for college-educated women 
 Sigma Lambda Alpha (honor society), recognizes academic achievement in the field of landscape architecture